The Karsan J10 is a minibus produced by the Turkish commercial vehicles manufacturer Karsan from 2010 to 2015.

Overview

It is the successor of the Karsan J9 Premier that was based on the platform of the 1980s' Peugeot J9. Standard equipment includes ABS, EBD, automatic rear doors, sunroof, electric windows, central locking and optional, air conditioning.

References

External links

Official website

J10
Minibuses
Rear-wheel-drive vehicles
2010s cars